Paralia Koulouras is a beach of Larissa regional unit in Greece.

The settlement has a clean beach and natural beauties. Every year attracts tourists from everywhere.

External links
Παραλία Κουλούρας
Παραλία Κουλούρας on wikimapia

Populated places in Larissa (regional unit)